Leaf wrap or leafwrap is a term for various foods that are wrapped in leaves:

 Lo mai gai, a Cantonese leaf-wrapped dim sum
 Ssam, a Korean dish of various fillings wrapped in leafy vegetables
 Zongzi, a Chinese dish of rice and various fillings wrapped in leaves

See also

 Sushi, a Japanese dish of rice and various fillings wrapped in leaf-like seaweed

Leaves